Mayu may refer to:

 Mayu (given name), a feminine Japanese given name
 Mayu (river), a river of Burma
 Mayu Frontier District, a former administrative zone of Burma
 Mayu Island (妈屿), Shantou, China
 Mayu, Jinzhou, Hebei (马于镇), a town in southwestern Hebei, China
 Mayu, Rui'an (马屿镇), a town in Rui'an, Zhejiang, China
 Mayu Peninsula, a mountain range in Myanmar
 Meyab, Razavi Khorasan, village in Iran, also known as Mayu